Sankha Ukru (Quechua sankha cliff, ukru hole, pit, hollow, "cliff hole", also spelled Zanja Ucro) is a mountain in the Cordillera Central in the Andes of Peru which reaches a height of approximately . It is located in the Lima Region, Yauyos Province, Huancaya District.

References 

Mountains of Peru
Mountains of Lima Region